Plum is a borough in Allegheny County, Pennsylvania, United States. The population was 27,144 at the 2020 census. A suburb of the Pittsburgh metropolitan area, it is located northeast of the city in what is commonly referred to as the East Hills suburbs. 

Plum is often referred to as "Plum Boro" or more correctly "Plum Borough" by locals to distinguish it from its previous status as a township. It was founded as Plum Township in 1788 and was reorganized as a borough in 1956. The borough took its name from nearby Plum Creek.

History
Plum Township was founded on December 18, 1788, as one of the original seven townships of Allegheny County. It originally extended as far south as Versailles (modern-day North Versailles Township), east to the county line, west to Pitt Township, and north to the Allegheny River. Plum has shrunk greatly over the years in area, but still remains among the larger municipalities in Allegheny County.

The 1889 history of Allegheny county, Pennsylvania, describes the township as having "no villages of importance", but listed the first postoffice, Antrim, 1840–1857; New Texas, a hamlet, in the geographic center of the township with "the usual mechanics, local stores, etc.", post office from 1856; and Logan's Ferry, on the Allegheny River and Allegheny Valley railroad, in the northeastern part of the township, deriving its name from early settler Alexander Logan and family, post office from 1844.

Geography
Plum Borough is the second largest borough (area-wise) in the state of Pennsylvania.

Streams
 Pucketa Creek joins the Allegheny River where the creek forms the boundary between the borough of Plum and the city of Lower Burrell.
 Abers Creek
 Plum Creek rises in the borough.
 Little Plum Creek

Surrounding communities
 Monroeville (south)
 Penn Hills (west)
 Oakmont (west)
 Harmar Township (north across Allegheny River)
 Cheswick (north across Allegheny River)
 Springdale (north across Allegheny River)
 Lower Burrell (north, in Westmoreland County)
 New Kensington (north, in Westmoreland County)
 Upper Burrell Township (northeast, in Westmoreland County)
 Murrysville (east, in Westmoreland County)

Demographics

At the 2010 census there were 27,126 people, 10,528 households, and 7,431 families living in the borough.  The population density was 935.4 people per square mile. There were 10,528 housing units at an average density of 363.0 per square mile. The racial makeup of the borough was 93.9% White, 3.6% African American, 0.1% Native American, 1.1% Asian, 0.00% Pacific Islander, 0.2% from other races, and 1.0% from two or more races. Hispanic or Latino of any race were 0.9%.

There were 10,528 households, 29.5% had children under the age of 18 living with them, 62.6% were married couples living together and 29.4% were non-families. 24.5% of households were made up of individuals, and 12.6% were one person aged 65 or older. The average household size was 2.55 and the average family size was 3.09.

The age distribution was 24.2% under the age of 20, 2.5% from 20 to 24, 24.4% from 25 to 44, 29.6% from 45 to 64, and 16.8% 65 or older. The median age was 42.6 years. For every 100 females, there were 97.6 males.

The median household income was $66,680 and the median family income was $74,941. Males had a median income of $54,119 versus $40,625 for females. The per capita income for the borough was $30,474. About 3.8% of families and 4.8% of the population were below the poverty line, including 6.3% of those under age 18 and 3.2% of those age 65 or over.

Government and politics
Boroughs in Pennsylvania (including Plum) are governed by a Mayor-Council system; in which the mayor has only a few powers and the council is the main legislative body. As of January 2020, the mayor is Harry Schlegel.

Education
The Plum Borough School District serves the borough grades K–12.  The elementary schools (grades K–4) are Center and Pivik. The middle elementary school is Holiday Park Elementary (grades 5–6). The junior high school is A.E. Oblock Junior High School (grades 7–8) and Plum Senior High School serves grades 9–12. The latest redistricting was approved by the Plum School Board in 2018. There were once three other elementary schools, which were called Renton Elementary School, Regency Park Elementary, and the other called Adlai E. Stevenson, both have since been torn down. Plum School District is governed by the Plum School Board.

Plum Borough is also serviced by the Plum Borough Community Library. The library houses the history room of the Allegheny Foothills Historical Society (the Historical Society also provides tours of the reconstructed Carpenter Family Log House in Boyce Park).

Landmarks
 Oakmont Country Club is partially located within Plum's borders, according to Google Maps.  The course has been consistently ranked as one of the five best by Golf Digest 100 Greatest Golf Courses in America. In 2007, Oakmont placed 5th by the magazine.  It is one of only a few courses ranked every year in the top ten of the publication's history. The top 50 toughest courses rank Oakmont also at No. 5, while GolfLink.com ranks it at No. 3 overall.  It hosted its ninth U.S. Open in 2016, the most of any course.
 The portion of the Pennsylvania Turnpike from mile markers 49 through 55 crosses through Plum.

Notable people
 William D. Boyce, founder of the Boy Scouts of America
 Pat McAfee, media personality, former punter for Indianapolis Colts, former punter/kicker West Virginia Mountaineers football team
 Elias (real name Jeffrey Sciullo), professional WWE wrestler
 Alex Kirilloff, professional baseball player for Minnesota Twins
 R. J. Umberger, former National Hockey League player
 Matt Morgan, former tackle for the St. Louis Rams and Buffalo Bills; former tackle University of Pittsburgh football team.

See also
 Logans Ferry Mine Tunnel

References

External links

Plum Borough official website
Allegheny Foothills Historical Society

Populated places established in 1788
Pittsburgh metropolitan area
Boroughs in Allegheny County, Pennsylvania
1788 establishments in Pennsylvania